The Okhandya Range ( or Оханджа) is a mountain range in Magadan Oblast, Far Eastern Federal District, Russia. The nearest airfield is Susuman Airport. 

The name of the range originated in the Even language.

Geography
The Okhandya Range rises in the southeastern area of the Chersky Range, to the north of the Upper Kolyma Highlands and east of the valley of the Byoryolyokh, the main tributary of the Ayan-Yuryakh. 

The range has also two other high peaks reaching  and  that are also unnamed. At the southeastern end of the Okhandya Range the Cherge Range, another subrange of the Chersky Mountains, stretches southeastwards in the same direction.

Rivers Omulyovka, Byoryolyokh and Okhandya have their sources in the range. Lake Momontai (Озеро Момонтай) is located to the east of the eastern slopes of the Okhandya Range.

See also
Highest points of Russian Federal subjects
List of mountains and hills of Russia

References

External links
Chersky National Park
Ranges of Russia

Mountain ranges of Magadan Oblast
Chersky Range